Auchterarder (meaning Upper Highland) is a small town located north of the Ochil Hills in Perth and Kinross, Scotland, and home to the Gleneagles Hotel. The  High Street of Auchterarder gave the town its popular name of "The Lang Toun" or Long Town.

The modern town is a shopping destination with a variety of independent shops and cafes.

History

The name "Auchterarder" derives from the Scottish Gaelic roots uachdar, àrd, and dobhar; it means ‘upland of high water.’

Auchterarder Castle stood to the north of the town in the area now known as Castleton. It is said to have been a hunting seat for King Malcolm Canmore in the 11th century and was visited by King Edward I in 1296. It was made ruinous in the 18th century and only fragments remained at the end of the 19th century.

In the Middle Ages, Auchterarder was known in Europe as 'the town of 100 drawbridges', a colourful description of the narrow bridges leading from the road level across wide gutters to the doorsteps of houses. The name appears in a charter of 1227 in a grant of land transaction to the Convent of Inchaffray. The Jacobite Earl of Mar's army torched the town on 25 January 1716.

In 1834, a controversy over the selection of a parish minister, following the recent passing of the Veto Act, allowed the parishioners of Auchterarder to reject the chosen minister, Rev Robert Young. Whilst this might have ended with the selection of an alternative, Young took the issue to the High Court. The court's decision concluded a link between state and church, directly contradicting the church's own view, and causing the first in a chain of events which would ultimately lead to the 1843 schism in the Church of Scotland. The remains of this church – the tower – have recently been renovated, and there is a plaque explaining what the church used to look like. As a result of the troubles of 1834, Auchterarder became one of the first towns in Scotland to build its own independent Free Church, indeed appearing to pre-empt the Disruption by commissioning the architect David Cousin to design their church in advance, such that it was completed in 1843 as soon as the Free Church formally came into existence.

Aytoun Hall, which is the main community events venue in the town, was completed in 1872.

The Burgh (Police) Scotland Act of 1892 bestowed Burgh status upon the town and a provost, two bailies, an honorary treasurer, Dean of Guild and six councillors were appointed to manage its affairs.

In 1983 the A9 was diverted to the south, bypassing Auchterarder and Aberuthven, to improve the connection between Stirling and Perth.

The 31st G8 summit was held in the town in July 2005 at the five-star Gleneagles hotel.

In 2008, Caledonian Crescent and Queens Crescent in Auchterarder had the most expensive house prices in Scotland.

Transport

Auchterarder contains a charger operated by Perth and Kinross Council located in Crown Inn Wynd for electric vehicle charging.

The town boasts a Community Bus Service which is low cost to normal users and free to young people and the elderly. The service links the three main residential areas of Auchterarder, namely the South, Townhead and the High Street as well as the two new developments near Hunter Street. The service connects to the local health centre and hospital.

Climate
Auchterarder has an oceanic climate (Köppen: Cfb).

Notable people
Andrew Fairlie, two-Michelin-starred chef, worked at Gleneagles
Eve Graham, singer with The New Seekers, was born in Auchterarder
Sandy Gunn,  Spitfire photo reconnaissance pilot shot down and taken prisoner in Norway during the Second World War, and executed after the "Great Escape"
Rev Robert Haldane preached here 1797 to 1806
Stephen Hendry, seven-time world snooker champion, lived in Auchterarder
James Kennaway, novelist, was born in Auchterarder
Rev Dr G. A. Frank Knight DD FRSE (1869–1937) minister of the Free Church 1892–1900
Rev Robert Nisbet DD FRSE (1814–1874) religious author, went to Auchterarder School
Prof John Monteath Robertson FRSE (1900–1989) crystallographer

References

External links 
 
 Auchterarder Website with details of local places and businesses
 Visit Scotland - Auchterarder and The Ochils
 Explore the Auchterarder Path Network - Perth and Kinross Countryside Trust

 
Royal burghs